Neal Dow Becker (Feb. 13, 1883 - May 16, 1955) was a manufacturer, attorney, and Consul General to Bulgaria.

Becker was born in Cherry Creek, New York.  Becker graduated from Cornell University in 1905. While at Cornell, he was a member of the Glee Club and the Debate Team. He was also elected into the Sphinx Head Society at Cornell.

Becker then practiced law in New York City.

Becker served as a Trustee of Cornell University and was chairman of the Board from 1947-1953. He was a member of the Council on Foreign Relations, and he was a co-founder of the American Australian Association in 1948.

References

Cornell University alumni
1883 births
1955 deaths
American diplomats
20th-century American lawyers
American expatriates in Bulgaria